is a Japanese professional footballer who plays as a forward for  club Cerezo Osaka.

Playing career
Fujio was born in Osaka Prefecture on May 2, 2001. He joined J1 League club Cerezo Osaka from the youth team in 2020. He scored a last minute goal against Urawa Red Diamonds on his senior team debut after coming onto the pitch as a substitute in the 86' minute.

References

External links

2001 births
Living people
Association football people from Osaka Prefecture
Japanese footballers
J1 League players
J3 League players
Cerezo Osaka players
Cerezo Osaka U-23 players
Mito HollyHock players
Tokushima Vortis players
Association football forwards